St John's, Castlerigg and Wythburn is a civil parish in Allerdale district, Cumbria, England. In the 2011 census it was recorded as having a population of 422. There is a parish council; its archives 1894–1995 are held at the Cumbria Archive Service in Carlisle.  in 2004 a parish plan was drawn up and approved by the parish council.

The parish covers an area on either side of the A591 road from Dunmail Raise in the south to the outskirts of Keswick in the north, and extends to include the valley of St John's in the Vale in the north east. The neighbouring parishes, listed anti-clockwise, are Lakes in South Lakeland district to the south; Patterdale, Matterdale and Threlkeld in Eden District to the east, the border following the mountain ridge and crossing the summit of Helvellyn; Underskiddaw and Keswick to the north; and Borrowdale to the west.

There are 23 grade II listed buildings or structures in the parish including Wythburn Church and St John's Church, St John's in the Vale, and 10 scheduled monuments including Castlerigg stone circle.

The village of Wythburn was drowned in the construction of Thirlmere reservoir, completed in 1894, although its church survives.

The parish has also been known as Castlerigg St John's and Wythburn, and with various variations of the presence or absence of comma, full stop after "St", and apostrophe.

References

Further reading
 Local history project supported by England Rural Development Programme

External links
 Cumbria County History Trust: St. John's, Castlerigg and Wythburn (nb: provisional research only – see Talk page)

 Castlerigg St John: historical and genealogical information at GENUKI
 Wythburn: historical and genealogical information at GENUKI

Civil parishes in Cumbria
Allerdale